Friedland is an Amt in the Mecklenburgische Seenplatte district, in Mecklenburg-Vorpommern, Germany. The seat of the Amt is in Friedland.

The Amt Friedland consists of the following municipalities:
 Datzetal
 Friedland
 Galenbeck

References

Ämter in Mecklenburg-Western Pomerania
Mecklenburgische Seenplatte (district)